Nagara Dam is an earthfill dam located in Chiba Prefecture in Japan. The dam is used for water supply. The catchment area of the dam is 3.4 km2. The dam impounds about 81  ha of land when full and can store 10000 thousand cubic meters of water. The construction of the dam was started on 1966 and completed in 1993.

References

Dams in Chiba Prefecture
1993 establishments in Japan
Dams completed in 1993
Nagara, Chiba